Rob Riley was a British comic strip that appeared in every issue of Ranger comic before this was incorporated into "look and Learn" after forty issues.  Rob Riley continued to be featured during the 1960s and 1970s.  It was a black and white strip drawn by Stanley Houghton.

It was a fairly realistic strip about an eponymous contemporary British schoolboy, set in the fictional town of Westhaven-on-Sea. Originally, this town was based upon Dartmouth in Devon, although the later aerial pictures show the town as being an oyster-shaped bay. Dartmouth Castle is shown in the first ever instalment of the story in Ranger, dated 18 September 1965. An amalgamation of Dartmouth and Kingswear can clearly be seen in the bottom panel of the first page instalment of Rob Riley appearing in "Ranger", dated 20 November 1965. The story follows Rob from adolescence as he begins secondary school through to adulthood, by which time he is employed as a Private Detective. At one point he obtained a scholarship to a public school, the strip dealt with the social issues this raised. Slightly unusually for its time, he had a black friend.

It started in the Ranger, but it transferred to Look and Learn along with the better-known The Trigan Empire.

External links
example of strip

British comic strips